The 2010 CAF Super Cup was the 18th CAF Super Cup, an annual football match in Africa organized by the Confederation of African Football (CAF), between the winners of the previous season's two CAF club competitions, the CAF Champions League and the CAF Confederation Cup. The match was contested between TP Mazembe of the Democratic Republic of the Congo, who won the 2009 CAF Champions League, and Stade Malien de Bamako of Mali, who won the 2009 CAF Confederation Cup.

Teams

Match details

Champions

References

External links
TP Mazembe beat Stade Malien to win Africa Super Cup  (BBC Sport)
TP Mazembe 2-0 Stade Malien: Mazembe Wins African Super Cup (Goal.com)

Super
2010
TP Mazembe matches
International club association football competitions hosted by the Democratic Republic of the Congo